Ayeesha Aiman is an Indian model and beauty pageant titleholder. She was crowned Glamanand Miss India International 2015 and she represented India at Miss International 2015 pageant held in Tokyo, Japan. She was awarded Panasonic Beauty Ambassador for the year 2015 award by the Panasonic organisation and Miss Visit Japan Tourism Ambassador by the Japan Tourism and International Cultural association at Miss International pageant. Supriya Aiman was awarded Asia Star Model award in South Korea, Seoul in the year of 2018 may in Asia Model Festival irrespective of her contribution in The modelling industry.

Career

She has been modelling since the year 2012 and has walked the Runway for Lakme Fashion Week, Madame Style Week, Blenders Pride Bangalore Fashion Week, Chennai International Fashion Week, Volvo Coimbatore Fashion Week and for the Gitanjali Group. She has also been a part of Kingfisher Ultra Fashion Tour, International Gems and Jewellery Show, Runway Showcase, Femina (India) Showcase, Times Wedding Fashion Fiesta, Galani Fashion Show, INIFD, Lakhotia Institute of Fashion & Design, Kash Fashion Show, IDT and Technotex. She has worked with designers Agnimitra Paul, AD Singh, Rocky Star, Gavin Miguel, Anita Dongre, James Ferreira, Tarun and Tejas, Mebaz, Hari Anand, Mumtaz Khan, Manoviraj Khosla, Sumit Das Gupta, Anitha Reddy, Abhishek Dutta, Mayur Galani, Jaya Mishra  to name a few.

Pageantry

Glamanand Supermodel India 2015
In October 2014, she was chosen by the Glamanand Supermodel India to represent India at Miss International 2015 held in Tokyo, Japan. She succeeded Jhataleka Malhotra as Miss International India.

Miss International 2015
She represented India at the Miss International 2015 pageant held Tokyo, Japan from 16 October to 5 November and was awarded as Panasonic Beauty Ambassador of the year 2015 by Panasonic and Visit Japan Tourism Ambassador by Japan Tourism.

References

https://www.businessupturn.com/entertainment/movies/former-miss-india-international-ayeesha-aiman-joins-the-cast-of-randeep-hoodas-inspector-avinash/amp/

External links

Femina Miss India
Living people
1993 births
People from Patna
Beauty pageant contestants from India
Miss International 2015 delegates
Female models from Bihar